Fabio Cianchetti (born 22 April 1952) is an Italian cinematographer. He contributed to more than seventy films since 1983, including The Tiger and the Snow, The Beast in the Heart and The Dreamers.

Awards
 David di Donatello for Best Cinematography (2000)

References

External links 

1952 births
Living people
Italian cinematographers
Ciak d'oro winners
David di Donatello winners
Nastro d'Argento winners